The Soldier's Creed is a standard by which all United States Army personnel are expected to live. All U.S. Army enlisted personnel are taught the Soldier's Creed during basic training, and recite the creed in public ceremonies at the conclusion of training. Both the Soldier's Creed and the Noncommissioned Officer's Creed are required knowledge at enlisted promotion boards to compete for the rank of sergeant and above, as well as 'Soldier of the Month' boards. It is also common practice to recite the Soldier's Creed at the graduation ceremony from Army ROTC. Unlike the U.S. Uniformed Services Oath of Office or the Oath of Enlistment, the Soldier's Creed is not a legally-binding oath and can be affirmed by both commissioned officers and enlisted soldiers.

History
The current version of the Soldier's Creed is a product of the 'Warrior Ethos' program authorized by the then Army Chief of Staff Eric K. Shinseki in May 2003. It was written by members of Task Force Soldier's Warrior Ethos Team, and was first approved in its current format by the next Army Chief of Staff Peter Schoomaker on 13 November 2003. The introduction of the Soldier's Creed kicked off a campaign known as 'Task Force Soldier'. This is a leadership commitment to soldiers ensuring they are prepared for combat and embody the Warrior Ethos contained in the Soldier's Creed. It seems to have been discussed in Congress in a 'Hearing on Army Issues' held by Senator John W. Warner on or about 19 November 2003. It was first published in the magazine Infantry on 22 December 2003.

Soldiers stand at attention when formally reciting the Soldier's Creed as part of an official ceremony.

Current version

U.S. Army Warrior Ethos 
The U.S. Army Warrior Ethos has been incorporated into the Soldier's Creed and is italicized in the text above (as is quite common in any print version supplied by the U.S. Army itself).

Pre-2003 version

See also
Airman's Creed (U.S. Air Force)
 Code of the U.S. Fighting Force
Creed of the United States Coast Guardsman (U.S. Coast Guard)
Infantryman's Creed (U.S. Army, Infantry Branch)
Noncommissioned officer's creed (U.S. Army)
Quartermaster Creed (U.S. Army, Quartermaster Corps)
Ranger Creed (U.S. Army, Rangers)
Rifleman's Creed (U.S. Marine Corps)
Sailor's Creed (U.S. Navy)

References

External links
 New values cards, Warrior Ethos ‘dogtags’ available to Army units
 Web Version of U.S. Army FM 3-21.75 The Warrior Ethos and Soldier Combat Skills
Army slide show on the Warrior Ethos

United States Army traditions
Warrior code
2003 works
Works originally published in American magazines